4:44 is the thirteenth studio album by American rapper Jay-Z. It was released on June 30, 2017, through Roc Nation as an exclusive to Sprint and Tidal customers. The album is the first in a planned series of music exclusives from the Sprint–Tidal partnership. On July 2, the album was made available for free digital download on Tidal's site for a limited time. A physical edition was released on July 7, including three additional tracks. On the same day, the album was made available to other streaming platforms, such as Apple Music, Google Play Music and Amazon Music.

Like Jay-Z's previous album, Magna Carta Holy Grail (2013), 4:44 was not preceded by any singles. The album was recorded from December 2016 to June 2017, and produced by No I.D., with additional contributions by Jay-Z himself. James Blake and Dominic Maker also contributed production to the album's bonus tracks. It features guest appearances from Frank Ocean, Damian Marley, Jay-Z's wife Beyoncé, and his mother, Gloria Carter. It also has additional vocal contributions from his daughter Blue Ivy Carter, James Fauntleroy, Kim Burrell and The-Dream.

The album was widely acclaimed by critics, who praised its emotional and personal content. It debuted at number one on the US Billboard 200 with 262,000 album-equivalent units in its first week, making it Jay-Z's 14th album to top the chart.  The album spawned three singles, the title track "4:44", "Bam" and "Family Feud", as well as several music videos, directed by a variety of high-profile collaborators. On July 5, the album was certified platinum by the Recording Industry Association of America (RIAA), in recognition of one million copies purchased by Sprint and offered to consumers as free downloads. At the 60th Annual Grammy Awards, the album received a Grammy Award nomination for Album of the Year, while the title track was nominated for Song of the Year and "The Story of O.J." was nominated for Record of the Year.

Background and recording

In June 2017, 4:44 posters in New York City, Los Angeles, and Miami, as well as internet banner ads, teased the release of the album. A one-minute teaser ad was aired during the NBA Finals on June 7 featuring actors Mahershala Ali, Lupita Nyong'o, and Danny Glover, ending with "4:44 – 6.30.17, Exclusively on Tidal".

On June 18, Father's Day, a clip titled "Adnis" was posted on Sprint's YouTube page. Adnis was Jay-Z's father's name. A second teaser trailer was released on June 27 titled "Kill Jay Z", which featured a young man with a "Stay Black" T-shirt. A third teaser followed on June 28 titled "ManyFacedGod", featuring Lupita Nyong'o crying "hysterically" on the floor.

No I.D. says Jay-Z approached him about working together, and initially declined. He cited feeling "uninspired" and "didn't think [he] had anything at the time". However, he researched Quincy Jones as inspiration to begin work with Jay-Z. No I.D. states he "began to play the samples like I would play an instrument." To get inspiration for 4:44, No I.D. pointed to albums such as What's Going On by Marvin Gaye, Confessions by Usher, The Blueprint by Jay-Z, Illmatic by Nas, and My Beautiful Dark Twisted Fantasy by Kanye West, saying he "analyzed the mistakes and tried not to make those mistakes."

The album was largely recorded in No I.D.'s home studio in Hollywood. Its recording began in late December 2016, according to No I.D. It was finished shortly before the album's release. "4:44" was written when Jay-Z woke up one morning at 4:44 am, and recorded at his house using Beyoncé's microphone.

Composition
4:44 is a hip hop and conscious hip hop album. It contains samples from many genres, like funk, progressive rock, reggae, hip hop and soul. These include Stevie Wonder's "Love's in Need of Love Today", The Clark Sisters's "Ha Ya (Eternal Life)", Donny Hathaway's "Someday We'll All Be Free", Fugees's "Fu-Gee-La", and Nina Simone's "Four Women" and "Baltimore". While most of the samples span previous decades, the title track to 4.44 is sampled from the 2016 record 'Late Nights and Heartbreaks' from independent British group Hannah Williams and The Affirmations. Complex Networks premiered the official music video to the original record, directed by British Hip-Hop video director Nick Donnelly

Elia Leight of Rolling Stone notes 4:44 is "sample-heavy at a time when so much of rap has moved away from that sound". Jay-Z and No I.D. created a playlist based on Jay-Z's taste, and sampled some songs of it in the album. Later, Jay-Z posted the playlist, titled 4:44 Inspired By, on Tidal.

On the album, Jay-Z touches on a wide array of topics, such as the ongoing hip hop culture, his family life, his relationships, stereotypes and racism. Many critics have noted that 4:44 is a response to Lemonade, with Jay-Z referencing lines from the album. For example, the "You better call Becky with the good hair" line on Beyoncé's "Sorry", with Jay-Z retorting, "Leave me alone, Becky" in "Family Feud". However, No I.D. said that to make the entire album a response to Lemonade was not the intention. Instead, Jay-Z wanted to focus on an album "where I talk about the things that I've never talked about".

"Kill Jay Z" is about "killing" his ego Jay Z (without hyphen), featured in his previous album Magna Carta Holy Grail. The song references his friendship with Kanye West, as well as an incident in which he shot his brother. He also references his rumored extramarital relationships. "The Story of O.J." references racism, stereotypes and the experience of being a black person in America. "Smile" discusses his mother being a lesbian, while featuring a poem from her. "Caught Their Eyes" references Prince; before his death, Prince befriended Jay-Z, giving exclusive streaming rights for his catalog to Tidal. "4:44", the album's title track, is "one long, tearful, soul-ripped-open apology" dedicated to Beyoncé.

"Family Feud" is about a "separation within the culture" and "tensions in the black community and at home". The track also references his infidelity. The "reggae-tinged" song "Bam" features Damian Marley's vocals, with a four-piece horn section and guitar. Jay-Z said about the track: "it's just jammin', it's just like the song. But it's secretly Shawn Carter saying, 'Man, you need a bit of ego.'" "Moonlight" references two films nominated to the 2017 Oscars for Best Picture, Moonlight and La La Land, as a "commentary on the culture and where we're going".

Release and promotion
Jay-Z held listening parties for the album at participating Sprint stores on June 29, 2017. 4:44 was released as an exclusive to Tidal and Sprint subscribers on June 30, the first in a planned series of music exclusives from the Sprint–Tidal partnership. Through an iHeartRadio and Roc Nation partnership, 4:44 was played on a loop on various rap stations until July 1. Jay-Z provided song commentary via iHeartRadio upon the album's release. On July 7, a physical version of the album featuring three additional tracks was released, and the album was made available to other streaming platforms, such as Apple Music, Google Play Music and Amazon Music.

Music videos were released for every song on the album except "Caught Their Eyes". An animated music video for "The Story of O.J." was uploaded on Tidal soon after the album's release. The video was directed by Mark Romanek and Jay-Z and shows a character named Jaybo, based on The Story of Little Black Sambo. This was followed weekly by "4:44" directed by TNEG, "Bam" directed by Rohan Blair-Mangat, "Kill Jay Z" directed by Gerard Bush and Christopher Renz, "Adnis" directed by Romanek, "Moonlight" directed by Alan Yang, and "ManyFacedGod" directed by Francesco Carrozzini. On November 24, three further videos were released: "Legacy" directed by Jeymes Samuel, "Smile" directed by Miles Jay and "Marcy Me" directed by Ben and Joshua Safdie. On December 29, an all-star video for "Family Feud" was released (featuring actors Jessica Chastain, Michael B. Jordan, Janet Mock, and David Oyelowo among many others), directed by Ava DuVernay and scored by Flying Lotus, followed on January 7, 2018, by "Blue's Freestyle", directed by Maurice Taylor of Artlife Studios.

Singles
The album's title track, "4:44", was released as the lead single to rhythmic contemporary radio on July 11, 2017.

The song "Bam", was released as the second single to rhythmic contemporary radio on September 26, 2017.

The song "Family Feud" was released to British contemporary hit radio on January 26, 2018, as the album's third single.

Tour
On July 10, Jay-Z announced the 32-date North American 4:44 Tour beginning on October 27 at the Honda Center in Anaheim, California. The tour concluded on December 21 at The Forum in Inglewood.

Critical reception

4:44 was released to universal acclaim from critics. At Metacritic, which assigns a normalized rating out of 100 to reviews from mainstream publications, the album received an average score of 82, based on 29 reviews. Many critics praised its emotional and personal content. Neil McCormick of The Daily Telegraph gave the album a perfect score, stating "It's a highly personal work bravely opening up the artist's very human flaws as an example to others, locating in his own suffering a path towards forgiveness, redemption and, ultimately, a better world. There is little braver than admitting your mistakes and trying to change your ways. By embracing vulnerability, Jay Z has taken a step towards genuine wisdom."

Brittany Spanos of Rolling Stone called the album "a stunning, raw and mature apology that's as much an ode to partnership and family as it is an example of how vulnerability can make for truly excellent art." Spanos states "4:44" is "the most specific and touching" song on the album. 4:44 was named "Best New Music" by Pitchfork, with reviewer Sheldon Pearce writing, "The most crafty and evasive MC lays bare his complicated life. This late-career gem is personal and diamond-sharp, confronting the failings and legacy of Shawn Carter and America." He also calls the album a "historical artifact".

Accolades

Commercial performance
4:44 debuted at number one on the US Billboard 200 with 262,000 album-equivalent units, (of which 174,000 copies were pure album sales) in its first week, according to Nielsen Soundscan. This became Jay-Z's 14th number one album. The album was a Tidal exclusive for the first week and the streaming numbers on Tidal were not reported. On July 5, 2017, the album was certified platinum by the Recording Industry Association of America (RIAA) for sales of over a million units. The album was certified only a week after its release. During this period, it was reported that mobile company Sprint, a major share-holder in Tidal, had bought a million copies of 4:44 and provided subscribers free downloads of the album.  In its second week, the album remained at number one on the chart, earning an additional 87,000 units. In its third week, the album dropped to number seven on the chart, earning 45,000 more units. In its fourth week, the album climbed to number five on the chart, earning 33,000 units. By the end of 2017, the album had accumulated 639,000 album-equivalent units in the United States, with 399,000 as pure sales, not including the one million copies given away. In 2017, 4:44 was ranked as the 36th most popular album of the year on the Billboard 200.

Track listing
Credits adapted from digital booklet.

Notes
  signifies a co-producer
  signifies an additional producer
 "4:44" features background vocals by Kim Burrell
 "Family Feud" originally didn't feature credited vocals by Beyoncé
 "Marcy Me" features additional vocals by The-Dream
 "Legacy" features intro vocals by Blue Ivy Carter and background vocals by James Fauntleroy
 "ManyFacedGod" is stylized as "MaNyfaCedGod"

Sample credits
 "Kill Jay Z" contains a sample and portions from "Don't Let It Show", written by Alan Parsons and Eric Woolfson, and performed by The Alan Parsons Project.
 "The Story of O.J." contains elements and excerpts from "Four Women", written and performed by Nina Simone; elements from "Kool is Back", as performed by Funk, Inc.; and excerpts from "Kool Back Again", written by Gene Redd and Jimmy Crosby, and performed by Kool & the Gang.
 "Smile" contains elements and excerpts from "Love's in Need of Love Today", written and performed by Stevie Wonder.
 "Caught Their Eyes" contains a sample and excerpts from "Baltimore", written by Randy Newman, and performed by Nina Simone; and an excerpt from the Army–McCarthy hearings.
 "4:44" contains samples of "Late Nights and Heartbreak", written by Kanan Keeney, and performed by Hannah Williams and The Affirmations; and an interpolation of "(At Your Best) You Are Love" written by Ernie Isley, Marvin Isley, Chris Jasper, Rudolph Isley, O'Kelly Isley, Jr. and Ronald Isley, and performed by The Isley Brothers.
 "Family Feud" contains portions of "Ha Ya (Eternal Life)", written by Elbernita Clark, and performed by The Clark Sisters.
 "Bam" contains elements from "Bam Bam", written by Winston Riley and Ophlin Russell, and performed by Sister Nancy; and elements from "Tenement Yard", written by Roger Lewis, and performed by Jacob Miller. R. Henry Gordon, N. N. McCarthy and Frederick "Toots" Hibbert hold the copyright to the original version of the song "Bam Bam" (of which the Sister Nancy version is a cover). The original songwriters were not credited or issued royalties for use of the song by Sister Nancy or Jay-Z.
 "Moonlight" contains a sample of "Fu-Gee-La", as performed by The Fugees.
 "Marcy Me" contains elements from "Todo o Mundo e Ninguém", written by José Cid and Tozé Brito, and performed by Quarteto 1111; and an interpolation of "Unbelievable", as performed by The Notorious B.I.G., from the album Ready to Die.
 "Legacy" contains a sample and excerpts from the recording "Someday We'll All Be Free", written by Edward Howard, and performed by Donny Hathaway; and an interpolation of "Glaciers of Ice", written by Corey Woods, Dennis Coles, Robert Diggs, and Elgin Turner, and performed by Raekwon.
 "Blue's Freestyle / We Family" contains elements and portions of "La Verdolaga", written by Sonia Bazanta, and performed by Totó la Momposina.
 "ManyFacedGod" embodies portions of "Pillow Talk", written by Michael Burton, and performed by Sylvia Robinson; a sample of "Going in Circles", written by Jerry Peters and Anita Poree, and performed by Dwight T. Ross; and an interpolation of "Partition", written by Terius Nash, Dimitri Jay, Beyoncé, Justin Timberlake, Timothy Mosley, Jerome Harmon, Dwane Weir and Mike Dean, and performed by Beyoncé.

Personnel
Adapted from digital booklet.

Musicians
 Steve Wyreman – guitar , bass , celeste , CS-80 , electric piano , synths , Hammond organ 
 Jonah Levine – trombone 
 Crystal Rovél Torres – trumpet and flugelhorn 
 Kenneth Whalum – tenor sax 
 Nathan Mercereau – French horn , guitar , piano , Moog , ARP String Ensemble , celeste 
 Ron Gilmore Jr. – vocoder 
 James Blake – piano 

Technical
 Gimel "Young Guru" Keaton – recording
 Jimmy Douglass – mixing
 Dave Kutch – mastering
 James Fauntleroy – vocal production 
 Stuart White – vocal recording 
 Mike Miller – vocal recording 
 Michael Law Thomas – additional recording engineering 
 Casey Cuayo – assistant engineering 

Artwork
 Willo Perron – creative direction
 Brian Roettinger – art direction

Charts

Weekly charts

Year-end charts

Certifications

 By July 2, the album was offered as a free download, sponsored by Sprint, via the website 444.tidal.com. Those album downloads—which were free to the consumer but purchased by Sprint for distribution—were counted by the RIAA towards the Platinum certification. Roc Nation told Billboard that the certification reflects those 1 million downloads, and no streams were applied towards the certification.

See also
 List of Billboard 200 number-one albums of 2017
 List of Billboard number-one R&B/hip-hop albums of 2017
 List of number-one albums of 2017 (Canada)

References

2017 albums
Albums produced by No I.D.
Albums produced by Jay-Z
Albums produced by James Blake (musician)
Jay-Z albums
Political hip hop albums
Roc Nation albums
Universal Music Group albums
Surprise albums